O'Kelly is a surname. Notable people with the surname include:

 Aloysius O'Kelly (1853–1936), Irish painter, brother of James Joseph O'Kelly
 Auguste O'Kelly (1829–1900), music publisher in Paris
 Christopher O'Kelly (1895–1922), Canadian recipient of the Victoria Cross
 Don O'Kelly (1924–1966), American actor
 Edward Peter O'Kelly (1846–1914), Irish politician
 Gabriel O'Kelly (died 1731), Irish clergyman
 George O'Kelly (1831–1914), Franco-Irish pianist and composer
 Henri O'Kelly (1859–1938), Franco-Irish composer, pianist and organist
 James O'Kelly (1735–1826), American Methodist clergyman
 James Joseph O'Kelly (1845–1916), Irish politician
 John J. O'Kelly (1872–1957), Irish politician
 Joseph O'Kelly (1828–1885), Franco-Irish composer and pianist
 Malcolm O'Kelly (born 1974), Irish rugby player
 Roger Demosthenes O'Kelly (1880–1962), African-American lawyer
 Seán T. O'Kelly (1882–1966), Irish politician, second President of Ireland
 Seumas O'Kelly (1881–1918), Irish writer

Fictional characters
 Michael the O'Kelly, hero of seven books by Manning O'Brine
 One of the titular families in The Kellys and the O'Kellys, the second novel of Anthony Trollope

See also
Albéric O'Kelly de Galway (1911–1980), Belgian chess grandmaster
Mary O'Kelly de Galway (1905-1999), Irish Belgian resistance operative

Anglicised Irish-language surnames